The Southern African Development Community (SADC) is an inter-governmental organization headquartered in Gaborone, Botswana. 

Its goal is to further regional socio-economic cooperation and integration as well as political and security cooperation among 16 countries in southern Africa.

Member states 

As of 2022, the SADC has a total of 16 member states:

Burundi has requested to join.

The origin and history of the SADC 

The origins of SADC are in the 1960s and 1970s, when the leaders of majority-ruled countries and national liberation movements coordinated their political, diplomatic and military struggles to bring an end to colonial and white-minority rule in southern Africa. The immediate forerunner of the political and security cooperation leg of today's SADC was the informal Frontline States (FLS) grouping. It was formed in 1980.

The Southern African Development Coordination Conference (SADCC) was the forerunner of the socio-economic cooperation leg of today's SADC.  The adoption by nine majority-ruled southern African countries of the Lusaka declaration on 1 April 1980 paved the way for the formal establishment of SADCC in April 1980.

Membership of the FLS and SADCC sometimes differed.

SADCC was transformed into SADC on 17 August 1992, with the adoption by the founding members of SADCC and newly independent Namibia of the Windhoek declaration and treaty establishing SADC. The 1992 SADC provided for both socio-economic cooperation and political and security cooperation. In reality, the FLS was dissolved only in 1994, after South Africa's first democratic elections. Subsequent efforts to place political and security cooperation on a firm institutional footing under SADC's umbrella failed.

On 14 August 2001, the 1992 SADC treaty was amended. The amendment heralded the overhaul of the structures, policies and procedures of SADC, a process which is ongoing. One of the changes is that political and security cooperation is institutionalised in the Organ on Politics, Defence and Security (OPDS); one of the principal SADC bodies. It is subject to the oversight of the organisation's supreme body, the Summit, which comprises the heads of state or government.

The organisation holds its own multi-sport event in the form of the  SADC Games , which was first held in 2004 in Maputo. Originally planned for an earlier date in Malawi and Lesotho, organisational issues led to abandonment of the plan and the SADC issuing a fine of $100,000 against Malawi. The first event in 2004 in Maputo resulted in over 1000 youths under-20 from 10 countries taking part in a sports programme including athletics, football, netball, boxing and basketball.

In August 2019 SADC adopted Swahili as its fourth working language, alongside English, French and Portuguese. Kiswahili – a lingua franca in the African Great Lakes region, other parts of East Africa, and to a lesser degree, parts of Southern Africa – is an official language of Tanzania, Kenya and Uganda and of the African Union.

Protocols 

SADC has 27 legally binding protocols dealing with issues such as Defence, Development, Illicit Drug Trade, Free Trade and Movement of People.

 Protocol on Energy (1996) – Intended to promote harmonious development of national energy policies. These development strategies set out tangible objectives for SADC and its Member States for infrastructure development in energy and its subsectors of woodfuel, petroleum and natural gas, electricity, coal, renewable energy, and energy efficiency and conservation.
 Protocol on Gender and Development – Member states are urged to accelerate implementation efforts towards the achievements of concrete and transformative changes in the lives of women and girls in the region. H.E. President Mutharika also expressed concern on the escalating incidents of gender based violence in the region, especially those perpetrated against women and girls, and used this occasion to sign a commitment to end child marriages, as part of the AU campaign to end Child Marriages in Africa.
 Protocol on Politics, Defence and Security Co-operation (2001) – Intended to foster regional security and defence cooperation, promote peace, political stability and conflict-management. The protocol initiated also an institutional reform of the SADC's Organ for Politics, Defence and Security (OPDS).

SADC FTA 

The SADC Free Trade Area was established in August 2008, after the implementation of the SADC Protocol on Trade in 2000 laid the foundation for its formation. Its original members were Botswana, Lesotho, Madagascar, Mauritius, Mozambique, Namibia, South Africa, Eswatini, Tanzania, Zambia and Zimbabwe, with Malawi and Seychelles joining later. Of the 15 SADC member states, only Angola and the Democratic Republic of Congo are not yet participating, however Angolan trade minister Joffre Van-Dúnen Júnior said in Luanda that his ministry is working to create conditions for Angola's accession to the SADC Free Trade Area in 2019. The SADC-Customs Union, scheduled to be established by 2010 according to SADC's Regional Indicative Strategic Development Plan (RISDP), is unlikely to become reality in the near future. This is because the European Union's Economic Partnership Agreements (EPA) with their inherent extra-regional freetrade regimes provided for several SADC members more benefits than deeper regional market integration within the framework of a SADC-Customs Union. Since these SADC countries formed four different groupings to negotiate and implement different Economic Partnership Agreements with European Union, the chance to establish a SADC-wide common external tariff as prerequisite for a regional customs union is missed.

On Wednesday 22 October 2008, SADC joined with the Common Market for Eastern and Southern Africa and the East African Community to form the African Free Trade Zone, including all members of each of the organizations.  The leaders of the three trading blocs agreed to create a single free trade zone, the African Free Trade Zone, consisting of 26 countries with a GDP of an estimated $624bn (£382.9bn). It is hoped the African Free Trade Zone agreement would ease access to markets within the zone and end problems arising from the fact that several of the member countries belong to multiple groups.

The African Free Trade Zone effective has been more than a hundred years in the making—a trade zone spanning the whole African continent from Cape to Cairo and envisioned by Cecil Rhodes and other British imperialists in the 1890s.  The only difference is that the African Free Trade Zone is the creation of independent African Countries.  The idea is a free trade zone spanning the whole continent from the Cape to Cairo (Cape Town in the Republic of South Africa to Cairo in Egypt).

In addition to eliminating duplicative membership and the problem member states also participating in other regional economic cooperation schemes and regional political and security cooperation schemes that may compete with or undermine each other, the African Free Trade Zone further aims to strengthen the bloc's bargaining power when negotiating international deals.

Challenges facing member countries 

SADC countries face many social, development, economic, trade, education, health, diplomatic, defence, security and political challenges.  Some of these challenges cannot be tackled effectively by individual members.  Cattle diseases and organised-crime gangs know no boundaries.  War in one country can suck in its neighbours and damage their economies.  The sustainable development that trade could bring is threatened by the existence of different product standards and tariff regimes, weak customs infrastructure and bad roads.  The socio-economic and political and security cooperation aims of SADC are equally wide-ranging, and intended to address the various common challenges.

One significant challenge is that member states also participate in other regional economic cooperation schemes and regional political and security cooperation schemes that may compete with or undermine SADC's aims.  For example, South Africa and Botswana both belong to the Southern Africa Customs Union, Zambia is a part of the Common Market for Eastern and Southern Africa, and Tanzania is a member of the East African Community.

According to Human Rights Watch, "SADC has been criticized for its laxity on making human rights compliance within its member states a priority".

Structure and decision-making procedures 
The organization has six principal bodies:

 The Summit, comprising heads of state or heads of government
 Organ on Politics, Defense and Security
 Council of Ministers
 SADC Tribunal
 SADC National Committees (SNCs)
 Secretariat

Except for the Tribunal (based in Windhoek, Namibia), SNCs and Secretariat, decision-making is by consensus.

Leaders

Chairperson

Executive Secretaries

Comparison with other regional blocs

See also 
Southern African Development Community Mission in Mozambique (SAMIM)
Common Market for Eastern and Southern Africa (COMESA)
East African Community (EAC)
Economic Community of Central African States (ECCAS)
Southern African Customs Union (SACU)
Economic Community of West African States (ECOWAS)
List of trade blocs
Rules of Origin
Market access
Free-trade area
Tariffs

References

Further reading 
Gabriël Oosthuizen, The Southern African Development Community: The organisation, its history, policies and prospects. Institute for Global Dialogue: Midrand, South Africa, 2006.
John McCormick, The European Union: Politics and Policies. Westview Press: Boulder, Colorado, 2004.
Muntschick, Johannes, The Southern African Development Community (SADC) and the European Union (EU). Regionalism and External Influence. Palgrave Macmillan: Cham. 2017. .
Ramsamy, Prega 2003 Global partnership for Africa. Presentation at the human rights conference on global partnerships for Africa's development, Gaborone: SADC

External links 

Agritrade website covering trade issues in southern Africa

 
Organisations related to Southern Africa
International organizations based in Africa
United Nations General Assembly observers
Organizations established in 1992
1992 establishments in Africa